Isoteolin is an antihypertensive and psychoactive chemical.

References

 Aporphine alkaloids
Methoxy compounds
Phenols